Chirindia is a genus of amphisbaenians in the family Amphisbaenidae. Commonly known as pink round-headed worm lizards, species in the genus Chirindia are native to East Africa and southern Africa, from Tanzania to South Africa. They are unpigmented worm lizards with rounded heads, and extensive fusion of the head shields.

Description
Chirindia are small and slender. They are uniformly, unpigmented flesh-coloured, tinged with purplish, and have minute teeth. They usually lack an ocular shield, and each eye is situated under the posterior part of a large fused shield, that combines the nasal, second and sometimes first upper labial, prefrontal and sometimes the ocular shield into one, so as to cover all of one side of the snout.

The pair of large shields, fused with the ocular to cover each side of the snout, combined with a small azygous rostral shield, are comparable to that of genus Placogaster of the Senegambia, but the paired ventral shields, and absence of pre-anal pores in some species distinguish them.

Behaviour and predators
Species in the genus Chirindia burrow in loose soil and feed on termites. They are present in clay, sandy or alluvial soils, and sometimes find refuge under stones and rotten logs. They are preyed on by jackals, ratels, kingfishers and snakes, of which some, like the dwarf wolf snake (Lycophidion nanum), are specialized to prey on them.

Species and subspecies
The genus Chirindia contains five valid species, some of which have recognized subspecies.
Chirindia ewerbecki  – Mbanja worm lizard
Chirindia ewerbecki ewerbecki 
Chirindia ewerbecki nanguruwensis 
Chirindia langi  – Lang's worm lizard
Chirindia langi langi 
Chirindia langi occidentalis  – Soutpansberg worm lizard
Chirindia mpwapwaensis  – Mpwapwa worm lizard
Chirindia rondoensis  – Nchingidi worm lizard
 Chirindia swynnertoni  – Swynnerton's worm lizard

Nota bene: A binomial authority or trinomial authority in parentheses indicates that the species or subspecies was originally described in a genus other than Chirindia.

References

 
Lizards of Africa
Lizard genera
Taxa named by George Albert Boulenger